Deoband is a town and a municipality in Saharanpur district in the state of Uttar Pradesh, India, about 150 km from Delhi. Darul Uloom Deoband, an Islamic seminary and one of the largest Islamic Institution of India is located there.

Etymology 
The native Hindi-Urdu name for the place is "Devband". According to one theory, it derives from "devi" (goddess) and "van" (forest), when this place was full of forests in the Mahabharata-era. A related argument is that it is derived from "devi" and "vandan" (praise), referring to the local Durga temples.

An apocryphal legend states that it gets its name from daeva (demon) and band (imprison), the story being that prophet Suleiman had imprisoned wicked demons here.

History
The 16th century Hindu saint Hith Harivansh Mahaprabhu and the founder of the Radhavallabh Sampradaya of Vaishnavism based in Vrindavan, was born in Deoband.

Deoband is listed in the Ain-i-Akbari as a pargana under Saharanpur sarkar, producing a revenue of 6,477,977 dams for the imperial treasury and supplying a force of 300 infantry and 60 cavalry. It had a brick fort at the time.

The Darul Uloom Deoband learning centre was established on 21 May 1866 by Fazlur Rahman Usmani, Sayyid Muhammad Abid, Muhammad Qasim Nanotawi, Mehtab Ali, Nehal Ahmad and Zulfiqar Ali Deobandi. The Deobandi Islamic movement originated in the Darul Uloom.

Geography

Demographics
Deoband has a population of 97,037 of which 53,538 are males while 43,499 are females as per the report released by Census India 2011. The population of children aged 0–6 is 12,200 which is 12.57% of the total population. The sex ratio is 812 females per 1000 males against the state average of 912. The child sex ratio in Deoband is around 917 compared to the Uttar Pradesh state average of 902. The effective literacy rate (for population 7 years and above) is 75.23%, higher than the state average of 67.68% with male literacy of 79.59% and the female literacy rate is 69.77%. Out of the total population, 24,559 were engaged in work or business activity. Of this, 22,551 were males while 2,008 were females and 89.91% were engaged in main work. The Scheduled Caste population was 3,576. Deoband had a total of 16,530 households in 2011.

Deoband Nagar Palika Parishad has a total administration over 15,630 houses to which it supplies basic amenities like water and sewage. It is also authorized to build roads within Nagar Palika Parishad limits and impose taxes on properties coming under its jurisdiction.

See also
 Darul Uloom Deoband
 Deobandi
 Islam in India
 Tabligh
 Usmani family of Deoband

References

Cities and towns in Saharanpur district
Deoband